Dughla is a small hamlet in Solukhumbu District in the Himalayas of Nepal, to the south of Khumbu Glacier. Gokyo to the northwest is a little higher in elevation than Dughla. The village lies in an elevated position above and to the northeast of the lake, obscured from views of the lake by a rocky precipice. There also exists a glacial lake Tshola Tsho  and Cho La Pass nearby.

References

External links
Photograph of the village 

Populated places in Solukhumbu District
Lakes of Koshi Province
Himalayas
Khumbu Pasanglhamu